Naupactus xanthographus is a species of beetle of the family Curculionidae native to South America, well known for its predation to more than 45 species of fruit trees of agricultural importance.

Description
They are medium-sized insects, adults reaching 11 mm to 14 mm. Its elytra, welded together, cover the abdomen and are covered in pigmented scales that form a pattern of yellow lines. Seasonality marks the pigmentation of the scales, being brown and ashy gray in winter, while yellow and green lines appear in spring-summer.

Range

Habitat

Ecology

Etymology

Taxonomy

References

Curculionidae
Beetles of South America